Phillip Anthony Senior (born 30 October 1982 ) is a former professional footballer who played as a goalkeeper.

Career
Senior made his first impact on the football scene at the age of 16 when Huddersfield manager Peter Jackson named him on the Town bench for a FA Cup tie against Wrexham in 1999.

References

External links

1982 births
Living people
Footballers from Huddersfield
English footballers
Association football goalkeepers
English Football League players
National League (English football) players
Huddersfield Town A.F.C. players
Northwich Victoria F.C. players
Droylsden F.C. players
Alfreton Town F.C. players
Ilkeston Town F.C. (1945) players
FC Halifax Town players